The 1893–94 season was Burslem Port Vale's second consecutive season of football in the English Football League. Winning their opening seven league games, Vale seemed destined for First Division football, however they won just six of their final 22 games and ended up in mid-table. Their remarkable start to the season has not been equalled by any Vale team to date, and counting the previous season's final game, which was a victory, their streak of eight league wins is still a club record. Vale had remedied their scoring trouble, with five players all besting the previous season's top scorer tally of five goals.

One of the club's most successful seasons, only in 1930–31 did Port Vale finish higher than seventh in the second tier of the Football League. With 16 teams in the First Division, Vale finished in 23rd place overall, their highest ever ranking at the end of any season.

Overview

Second Division

September 1893 was a perfect month for the "Valeites", achieving as they did seven wins out of seven games, scoring 30 goals in the process. Although two of these came against whipping boys Northwich Victoria, they did take apart eventual runners-up Small Heath 5–0. However this run came to an end with an 8–1 collapse at a highly physical Manchester City. During this run, on 9 September 1893, Lewis Campbell became the first Vale player to score a hat-trick, and also four goals in one game, as his team brushed aside Walsall Town Swifts 5–0.

They finished the season with a respectable 2–1 defeat to champions Liverpool at Anfield. Vale racked up 30 points, 10 points away from both the chance of promotion and the risk of relegation. Meshach Dean, Bob McCrindle, Billy Beats, and Alf Wood were all ever-presents, with Jimmy Scarratt and Lewis Campbell missing just one game each. At the end of the season McCrindle moved South, Campbell also left the area due to his wife not liking Burslem, though star striker Beats remained.

Cup competitions
For the second successive season they exited the FA Cup at the first qualifying stage thanks to defeat at home to Burton Swifts. In the Staffordshire Senior Cup they exited in the Second Round to Wolverhampton Wanderers after a 6–4 loss – Billy Beats scored a hat-trick yet still finding himself on the losing side. In the Birmingham Senior Cup they left at the Second Round after a 3–1 defeat at West Bromwich Albion.

League table

Results

Burslem Port Vale's score comes first

Football League Second Division

Results by matchday

Matches

FA Cup

Birmingham Senior Cup

Staffordshire Senior Cup

Player statistics

Appearances

Top scorers

Transfers

Transfers in

Transfers out

References
Specific

General

Port Vale F.C. seasons
Burslem Port Vale